Rogers Creek (also known as Marsh Creek) is a tributary of Huntington Creek, in Luzerne County, Pennsylvania, in the United States. It is designated as a Coldwater Fishery and a Migratory Fishery. The creek flows through a broad valley in some locations and a gorge in other locations. A number of mills were built along it in the late 1700s.

Course

Rogers Creek begins at the confluence of the tributaries Marsh Creek and Black Ash Creek in Ross Township. It flows south-southwest for several tenths of a mile, almost immediately entering Huntington Township. The creek then turns west for a short distance before turning south and then meandering south-southwest for several tenths of a mile. It then turns south and after a short distance, reaches its confluence with Huntington Creek at Huntington Mills.

Tributaries
Rogers Creek has two named tributaries, which are known as Marsh Creek and Black Ash Creek.

Geography and geology

For a portion of its length, Rogers Creek is in a broad valley with glacial deposits lying underneath it. Further downstream, the creek flows through a narrow bedrock gorge with several waterfalls.

During pre-glacial times, Rogers Creek likely flowed through a saddle  to the north of the gorge through which it currently flows. The saddle is now filled with glacial deposits and the road from Harveyville to Muhlenburg runs through its former location.

The surficial geology along Rogers Creek mainly consists of alluvium and bedrock consisting of sandstone and shale. In most of the rest of the creek's watershed, the surficial geology features a glacial or resedimented till known as Wisconsinan Till. Wisconsinan Outwash also occurs near the creek's headwaters. There is a patch of wetland in the watershed.

Watershed
The creek is entirely within the United States Geological Survey quadrangle of Shickshinny.

History
Rogers Creek was entered into the Geographic Names Information System on August 2, 1979. Its identifier in the Geographic Names Information System is 1185391. The creek is also known as Marsh Creek. This name appears on county highway maps published by the Pennsylvania Department of Transportation.

The first gristmill in Huntington Township was constructed at the mouth of Rogers Creek in 1788 by a Mr. Hopkins. Hopkins also constructed a sawmill at the same location. Nathan Beach constructed the Rogers Mill on the creek in 1798. In the early 1900s, the Commissioners of Luzerne County requested permission to construct a bridge over the creek two miles east of Harveyville.

Biology
The drainage basin of Rogers Creek is designated as a Coldwater Fishery and a Migratory Fishery. Wild trout naturally reproduce in the creek from its headwaters downstream to its mouth. They also do so in the tributary Marsh Creek.

See also
Kingsbury Brook, next tributary of Huntington Creek going downstream
List of tributaries of Fishing Creek (North Branch Susquehanna River)
List of rivers of Pennsylvania

References

Rivers of Luzerne County, Pennsylvania
Tributaries of Fishing Creek (North Branch Susquehanna River)
Rivers of Pennsylvania